TrapStar Turnt PopStar is the second and final studio album by American rapper and singer PnB Rock. The last album to be released during his lifetime, it was released as a double album on May 3, 2019, through Atlantic Records. It features guest appearances from Lil Durk, Tee Grizzley, XXXTentacion, Quavo, Mally Mall, Diplo, Lil Skies, Tory Lanez, and A Boogie wit da Hoodie. The deluxe edition of the album was released three days later on May 6, 2019. It features additional guest appearances from Lil Wayne, Roddy Ricch, and YoungBoy Never Broke Again. The album debuted at number four on the US Billboard 200.

Background
The album is split into two sides; The TrapStar and The PopStar; the former "focuses more on his humbling upbringing in the skin-toughening streets of Philly", whereas the latter "showcases the life he lives now as he finally celebrates and enjoys the fruits of his labor". PnB Rock stated that he wanted to do a double album "so you get both sides of me. That was me then, and this is me now. You know, you see the growth and the level up." He also held a listening party for the album in Philadelphia.

Commercial performance
TrapStar Turnt PopStar debuted at number four on the US Billboard 200 with 42,000 album-equivalent units (including 2,000 pure album sales) in its first week. It is PnB Rock's first US top ten debut. The album also accumulated a total of 45.73 million on-demand audio streams for its songs in its debut week.

Track listing

Notes
  signifies an original producer

Charts

Weekly charts

Year-end charts

References

2019 albums
PnB Rock albums
Atlantic Records albums
Albums produced by Cardo
Albums produced by Diplo